The 1995 NCAA Division I baseball tournament was played at the end of the 1995 NCAA Division I baseball season to determine the national champion of college baseball.  The tournament concluded with eight teams competing in the College World Series, a double-elimination tournament in its forty ninth year.  Eight regional competitions were held to determine the participants in the final event.  Each region was composed of six teams, resulting in 48 teams participating in the tournament at the conclusion of their regular season, and in some cases, after a conference tournament.  The forty-ninth tournament's champion was Cal State Fullerton, coached by Augie Garrido.  The Most Outstanding Player was Mark Kotsay of Cal State Fullerton.

Regionals
The opening rounds of the tournament were played across eight regional sites across the country, each consisting of a six-team field. Each regional tournament is double-elimination, however region brackets are variable depending on the number of teams remaining after each round. The winners of each regional advanced to the College World Series.

Bold indicates winner.

Atlantic I Regional at Tallahassee, FL

Atlantic II Regional at Coral Gables, FL

East Region at Clemson, SC

Mideast Regional at Knoxville, TN

Midwest I Regional at Wichita, KS

Midwest II Regional at Oklahoma City, OK
Hosted at All Sports Stadium in Oklahoma City, OK

South Regional at Baton Rouge, LA

West Regional at Fresno, CA

College World Series

Participants

Results

Bracket

Game results

All-Tournament Team
The following players were members of the College World Series All-Tournament Team.

Notable players
 Cal State Fullerton: Jeremy Giambi, Mark Kotsay, Mike Lamb
 Clemson: Kris Benson, Billy Koch, Matt LeCroy, Shane Monahan, Ken Vining, Scott Winchester
 Florida State: Randy Choate, J. D. Drew, Jonathan Johnson, Doug Mientkiewicz
 Miami (FL): Alex Cora, Jay Tessmer
 Oklahoma: Steve Connelly, Damon Minor, Ryan Minor, Russ Ortiz, Mark Redman
 Southern California: Gabe Alvarez, Brian Cooper, Morgan Ensberg, Seth Etherton, Randy Flores, Geoff Jenkins, Jacque Jones, Chad Moeller, Ernie Diaz
 Stanford: Dusty Allen, A. J. Hinch, Jason Middlebrook, Kyle Peterson
 Tennessee: R. A. Dickey, Todd Helton

Tournament notes 

 With USC's 22–17 win over Fresno State the two teams set a new tournament record for most combined runs (39).

See also
 1995 NCAA Division I softball tournament
 1995 NCAA Division II baseball tournament
 1995 NCAA Division III baseball tournament
 1995 NAIA World Series

References

Tournament
NCAA Division I Baseball Championship